Priscilla Jane Stephanie, Lady Roberts,  ( Low; 4 September 1949 – 29 June 2021), known as simply Jane Roberts, was the Curator of the Print Room at Windsor Castle from 1975 and the Royal Librarian from 2002 until her retirement in July 2013.

Background and education
Priscilla Jane Stephanie Low was the eldest daughter of Brigadier Toby Low, 1st Baron Aldington and his wife Araminta  MacMichael. She was educated at Cranborne Chase School, Westfield College (now part of Queen Mary, University of London), and the Courtauld Institute of Art.

Honours
Roberts was appointed a Member of the Royal Victorian Order (MVO) in 1984. She was subsequently promoted to Lieutenant (LVO) in 1995, Commander (CVO) in 2004, and to Dame Commander (DCVO) of the same Order in 2013. In 1995 She received the Queen Elizabeth II Version of the Royal Household Long and Faithful Service Medal for 20 years service to the British Royal Family. She would receive a bar for 10 subsequent years of service in 2005.

Personal life
On 13 December 1975, Jane Low married Sir Hugh Roberts, who was the Director of the Royal Collection and Surveyor of the Queen's Works of Art until April 2010. 

She and her husband lived at Adelaide Cottage, a grace and favour home near Frogmore House in Home Park, Windsor. The couple had two daughters: Sophie Jane Cecilia Roberts (born 28 March 1978) and Amelia Frances Albinia Roberts (born 1982).

She died on 29 June 2021, at the age of 71.

Works
1979: Holbein.  Oresko Books 
1985: Exhibition Catalogues Master Drawings in the Royal Collection
1987: Royal Artists. Grafton 
1989: Leonardo Da Vinci
1993: A King's Purchase
1993: Holbein and the Court of Henry VIII
1995: Views of Windsor: watercolours by Thomas and Paul Sandby
1997: Royal Landscape
1999: The King's Head: Charles I, King and Martyr
1999: Ten Religious Masterpieces from the Royal Collection: a Millennium celebration
2002: Royal Treasures (editor)
2004: George III and Queen Charlotte (editor)
2005: Unfolding Pictures: fans in the Royal Collection
2006: Queen Elizabeth II: a birthday souvenir album
2007: Five Gold Rings: a royal wedding souvenir album
2008: Charles, Prince of Wales: a birthday souvenir album

References

External Links
 
Photograph at Getty Images

English librarians
British women librarians
Alumni of Westfield College
Alumni of the Courtauld Institute of Art
Dames Commander of the Royal Victorian Order
Daughters of barons
Fellows of the Society of Antiquaries of London
1949 births
2021 deaths
Royal Librarians
Wives of knights